, also known as Hayashi Nobutatsu, was a Japanese Neo-Confucian scholar, teacher and administrator in the system of higher education maintained by the Tokugawa bakufu during the Edo period. He was a member of the Hayashi clan of Confucian scholars.

Hōkō was the tutor of Tokugawa Tsuneyoshi.

Following in the footsteps of his father, Hayashi Gahō, and his grandfather, Hayashi Razan, Hōkō would be the arbiter of official neo-Confucian doctrine of the Tokugawa shogunate.  As a result of his urging, the shōgun invested Confucian scholars as samurai.

Academician
Hōkō was the third Hayashi clan Daigaku-no-kami of the Edo period.  After 1691, Hōkō is known as the first official rector of the Shōhei-kō (afterwards known as the Yushima Seidō) which was built on land provided by the shōgun.  This institution stood at the apex of the country-wide educational and training system which was created and maintained by the Tokugawa shogunate.  Gahō's hereditary title was Daigaku-no-kami, which, in the context of the Tokugawa shogunate hierarchy, effectively translates as "head of the state university".

The scholars of the Hayashi school were taught to apply what they had learned from a Confucian curriculum.  Typically, they applied the Confucian texts conservatively, relying on Soong Confucian anlayis and metaphysical teachings.

The neo-Confucianist scholar Arai Hakuseki generally expressed scant regard for opinions expressed by Hayashi Hōkō.

Selected works 

 Kai hentai (Chinese Metamorphosis), reports of Chinese junks arriving in Nagasaki, 1640–1740.

See also
 Hayashi clan (Confucian scholars)

Notes

References

 Arakai, James T. and Haruo Shirane. (2008). Early Modern Japanese Literature: an Anthology, 1600–1900 (abridged). New York: Columbia University Press. ///;  OCLC 255022419
 De Bary, William Theodore, Carol Gluck, Arthur E. Tiedemann. (2005). Sources of Japanese Tradition, Vol. 2. New York: Columbia University Press. ; OCLC  255020415
 Nussbaum, Louis Frédéric and Käthe Roth. (2005). Japan Encyclopedia. Cambridge: Harvard University Press. ; OCLC 48943301
 Tarling, Nicholas. (1998). The Cambridge History of Southeast Asia. Vol. 1. Cambridge: Cambridge University Press.  ; ; ; ; ;  OCLC 43674066

External links
 Tokyo's Shōhei-kō (Yushima Sedō) today

Japanese writers of the Edo period
Advisors to Tokugawa shoguns
Japanese philosophers
Japanese Confucianists
1644 births
1732 deaths
Neo-Confucian scholars